

The Napoleonic Wars 

The Napoleonic wars was a series of wars lasting from 1803 to 1815. Spain was just one of the many countries which resisted the expansion of the French Empire under Napoleon I. The general population fought as Guerrillas, preventing the occupying French forces from obtaining supplies or safe passage.

Line Infantry 

The Spanish Line Infantry uniform changed several times during the Napoleonic wars. Both officially with the introduction of new model uniforms, the supply of British made uniforms, locally produced clothing and those captured as the spoils of war.

The M1797 uniform was officially listed as being white with collars, cuffs and facings according in the regimental facing colours and distinguished by their pattern combination. Three regiments were recorded as still wearing this uniform as late as May 1808.

The M1802 uniform was dark blue, with black facings piped red and red turn backs on the jacket. It was recorded as being issued with white trousers, and bicorns with red feathers or plumes. The main difference to separate regiments using this uniform was the buttons stamped with regimental symbols or numbers. Twelve regiments are recorded as still wearing this uniform in May 1808.

The issue of the M1805 uniform restored the official uniform's jacket colour to white and brought back the coloured facing colours. These were used to distinguish between regiments, by a combination of cuffs, collars and facings in either facing colour piped white or white piped with the facing colour. Buttons were also used, either silver or brass. Turnbacks on the jackets were always the facing colour.

Uniforms Issued

1st Regiment, Rey 

Issued with 1802 uniforms, which were still in use in May 1808, use possibly continued beyond this date. The M1805 uniform not issued was supposed to be white, with purple collars, cuffs and lapels piped in white with brass buttons.

2nd Regiment, Reina (1537) 

Issued with 1802 uniforms, which were still in use in May 1808, use possibly continued beyond this date. The M1805 uniform not issued was supposed to be white, with purple collars, cuffs and lapels piped in white with white metal buttons.

3rd Regiment, Principe (1537) 
The M1805 uniform was white with purple lapels and cuffs piped white, white collars piped purple with brass buttons. Use of this uniform continued to at least May 1808.

4th Regiment, Saboya (1537) 
Blacking lapels, cuffs and collars piped white with brass buttons.

5th Regiment, La Corona (1537) 

Issued with 1802 uniforms, which were still in use in May 1808, use possibly continued beyond this date. The M1805 uniform not issued was supposed to be white, with black collars, cuffs and lapels piped in white with white metal buttons.

6th Regiment, Africa (1559) 
Black lapels and cuffs piped white, white collars piped black with brass buttons.

7th Regiment, Zamora (1580) 
Black lapels and cuffs piped white, white collars piped black with white metal buttons.

8th Regiment, Soria (1591) 
Purple lapels and cuffs, white collars piped purple with

9th Regiment, Cordoba (1650) 
Red lapels, cuffs and collars piped white with brass buttons.

10th Regiment, Guadalajara (1657) 
Red lapels, cuffs and collars piped white with white metal buttons.

11th Regiment, Sevilla (1657) 
Black collars and cuffs piped white, white lapels piped black with white metal buttons.

12th Regiment, Granada (1657) 

Issued with 1802 uniforms, which were still in use in May 1808, use possibly continued beyond this date. The M1805 uniform not issued was supposed to be white, with light blue collars, cuffs and lapels piped in white with brass buttons.

13th Regiment, Valencia (1658) 
Sky blue lapels, cuffs and collars piped white with white metal buttons.

14th Regiment, Zaragoza (1660) 

Issued with 1802 uniforms, which were still in use in May 1808, use possibly continued beyond this date. The M1805 uniform not issued was supposed to be white, with green collars, cuffs and lapels piped in white with brass buttons.

15th Regiment, Espana (1660) 

Issued with 1802 uniforms, which were still in use in May 1808, use possibly continued beyond this date. The M1805 uniform not issued was supposed to be white, with green collars, cuffs and lapels piped in white with white metal buttons.

16th Regiment, Toledo (1661) 
Sky blue cuffs, lapels piped white with white collars piped sky blue with brass buttons.

17th Regiment, Mallorca (1682) 
Red lapels, cuffs piped white, white collars piped red with brass buttons.

18th Regiment, Burgos (1694) 
Green lapels and cuffs piped white, white collars piped green with brass buttons.

19th Regiment, Murcia (1694) 
Sky Blue lapels and cuffs piped white, white collars piped sky blue with white metal buttons.

20th Regiment, Leon (1694) 

Issued with 1802 uniforms, which were still in use in May 1808, use possibly continued beyond this date. The M1805 uniform not issued was supposed to be white, with red cuffs and lapels piped in white, white collars piped red with white metal buttons.

21st Regiment, Cantabria (1703) 
Sky blue cuffs and collar piped white, white lapels piped sky blue with white metal buttons.

22nd Regiment, Asturias (1703) 
Green lapels and cuffs piped white, white collars piped green with white metal buttons.

Regimental History

23rd Regiment, Fijo de Ceuta (1703) 
Using 1797 uniform as late as May 1808, green lapels, turnbacks and cuffs, cream collar with brass buttons. The M1805 uniform was not issued was supposed to be white, with green collars and cuffs piped in white, white lapels piped green with white metal buttons.

24th Regiment, Navarra (1705) 
Dark blue cuffs, lapels and collars piped white with brass buttons.

25th Regiment, Aragón (1711) 

Issued with 1802 uniforms, which were still in use in May 1808, use possibly continued beyond this date. The M1805 uniform not issued which was supposed to be white, with red collars and cuffs piped in white, white lapels piped red with white metal buttons.

26th Regiment, America (1764) 
Dark blue cuffs, lapels and collars piped white with white metal buttons.

27th Regiment, Princessa (1766) 
Purple cuffs, collars  piped white, white lapels piped purple with white metal buttons.

28th Regiment, Estremadur (1766) 

Issued with 1802 uniforms, which were still in use in May 1808, use possibly continued beyond this date. The M1805 uniform not issued was supposed to be white, with crimson collars, cuffs and lapels piped in white with brass buttons.

29th Regiment, Malaga (1791) 
Using 1797 uniform as late as May 1808, red lapels, turnbacks and cuffs, black collar with white metal buttons. The M1805 uniform was not issued was supposed to be white, with dark blue lapels and cuffs piped in white, white collars piped dark blue with white metal buttons.

30th Regiment, Jaen (1793) 
Not issued with the 1802 uniform, In May 1808 they wore the following M1805 uniforms: Dark blue cuffs and collars piped white, white lapels piped dark blue with white metal buttons.

31st Regiment, Ordenes Militares (1793) 
Dark blue cuffs and collars piped white, white lapels piped dark blue with white metal buttons.

32nd Regiment, Voluntarios de Castilla (1793) 

Issued with 1802 uniforms, which were still in use in May 1808, use possibly continued beyond this date. The M1805 uniform not issued which was supposed to be white, with crimson collars, cuffs and lapels piped in white with white metal buttons.

33rd Regiment, Voluntarios de Estado (1794) 

Issued with 1802 uniforms, which were still in use in May 1808, use possibly continued beyond this date. The M1805 uniform not issued which was supposed to be white, with crimson cuffs and lapels piped in white, white collars piped crimson with brass buttons.

34th Regiment, Voluntarios de Corona (1795) 

Issued with 1802 uniforms, which were still in use in May 1808, use possibly continued beyond this date. The M1805 uniform not issued was supposed to be white, with crimson cuffs and lapels piped in white, white collars piped crimson with white metal buttons.

35th Regiment, Borbon (1796) 
Crimson cuffs and collars piped white, white lapels piped crimson with white metal buttons.

Foreign Regiments in Spanish Service

36th Regiment, Irlanda (1709) 
Sky blue Jackets with yellow collars and lapels piped white, yellow cuffs and turnbacks, with brass buttons. White trousers.

37th Regiment, Hibernia (1709) 
Sky blue Jackets with sky blue collars piped yellow, yellow lapels piped white, yellow cuffs and turnbacks, with white metal buttons. White trousers.

38th Regiment, Ultonia (1709) 
Sky blue Jackets with yellow collars and lapels piped white, yellow cuffs and turnbacks, with white metal buttons. White trousers.

39th Regiment, Napoles (1707) 
Sky blue Jackets with yellow collars piped white, sky blue lapels piped white, yellow cuffs and turnbacks, with white metal buttons. White trousers.

Swiss Regiments in Spanish Service 
M1796 Uniform

M1805 Uniform

Uniforms Issued

1º Suizo de Wimpffen

2º Suizo de Reding Snr

3º Suizo de Reding Jnr 
Linked

4º Suizo de Betschartd

5º Suizo de Taxler

6º Suizo de Courten/Preux

Light Infantry Regiments 
The original Cazadores uniform of a black bicorn, green jacket with red lapels and cuffs was replaced with the M1800 issue of a dark blue jacket with red facings and maintaining the other equipment.

The M1802 uniform was styled after the hussar uniform of the time. A green jacket with yellow lace, red collars and cuffs with the Suhr (a type of leather & brass hat) replacing the bicorn for ordinary ranks.

The M1805 uniform returned to the bicorn, styled after the infantry uniform the colour of the jacket was changed to dark blue, with facing colours, combinations and button colour depending on regiment.

In 1808 some regiments were issued with French style shakos, including La Romana's division de norte. It is unclear which regiments, if any, in Spain were issued with shakos.

Uniforms Issued

1º de Aragón (1762) 
Red collar, cuffs and lapels piped white, red turn backs, red pocket piping with white metal buttons.

1º de Cataluña (1762) 
Yellow collars, cuffs and lapels yellow piped white, yellow turn backs, yellow pocket piping with brass buttons.

2º de Cataluña (1762) 
Dark blue collars piped white, yellow cuffs piped white with yellow cuff flaps. Yellow lapels, pocket piping, and turnbacks, with brass buttons.

Tarrogona (1792) 
Yellow collars, cuffs, lapels dark blue piped yellow, yellow turn backs and pocket piping with brass buttons.

Gerona (1792) 
Yellow collars, cuffs, lapels yellow piped white, yellow turn backs and pocket piping with white metal buttons.

2º de Aragón (1793) 
Dark blue collars piped white, cuffs, lapels and turn backs red piped white, red pocket piping with white metal buttons.

1º de Barcelona (1793) 
Yellow collars, cuffs, dark blue lapels piped white, yellow turn backs and pocket piping with white metal buttons.

2º de Barcelona (1793)

Barbastro (1794)

Voluntarios de Valencia (1794)

Campo Maior (1802)

Voluntarios de Navarra (1802)

Militia Infantry Regiments

Guard Infantry Regiments

Heavy Cavalry Regiments

M1802 Uniforms 
All regiments received the same uniform which was considered unpopular with the units themselves. Bicorns edged yellow with red plumes. Dark blue coats with white lapels piped red, crimson facings (collars, cuffs and turn-backs) with blue cuff flaps piped red and yellow lions on their collars. Waist coats and trousers were batched dyed a lemon colour, however this quickly bleached in the sun. The jacket used brass buttons, much like the infantry uniform of the time. The cavalry were issued long boots and blue breeches re-enforced with leather.

Horses were rare in Spain during the war, but those which could be located were issued with blue saddleclothes laced with yellow.

M1805 Uniforms Issued

1º Rey 
Collars, cuffs and lapels red piped yellow, red pocket piping, yellow button holes with brass buttons.

2º Reina 
Collars, cuffs and lapels sky blue piped red, red pocket piping, white button holes with white metal buttons.

3º Príncipe 
Collars, cuffs and lapels red piped white, red pocket piping, white button holes with white metal buttons.

4º Infante 
Collars, cuffs and lapels white piped yellow, white pocket piping, yellow button holes with brass metal buttons.

5º Borbón 
Collars, cuffs and lapels red piped white, red pocket piping, with white metal buttons.

6º Farnesio 
Collars, cuffs and lapels red piped yellow, yellow pocket piping, with white metal buttons.

7º Alcántara 
Red collars and cuffs piped green, green lapels piped white, green pocket piping, with white metal buttons.

8º España 
Yellow collars piped red, cuffs and lapels red piped yellow, red pocket piping, with white metal buttons.

9º Algarve 
Collars, cuffs and lapels yellow piped red, red pocket piping, with white metal buttons.

10º Calatravia 
Red collars, cuffs and lapels sky blue piped red, red pocket piping, with white metal buttons.

11º Santiago 
Collars, cuffs and lapels crimson piped red, red pocket piping, with white metal buttons.

12º Montesa 
Red collars and cuffs, lapels white piped red, red pocket piping, with white metal buttons.

Dragoon Regiments

Changes of 1803 
In 1803 all eight of the dragoon regiments raised in Spain were converted to light cavalry, with the first six converted to Cazadores a Caballo while Numancia and Lusitania were converted to Hussars (See these sections for Uniform during this time period). These were converted back to Dragoons in 1805.

M1805 Uniforms

1º Rey (1674) 
Collars, cuffs and lapels crimson piped white, crimson pocket piping, with white metal buttons. Bicorn edged in white with red plume.

2º Reina (1730) 
Collars, cuffs and lapels scarlet piped white, scarlet pocket piping, with white metal buttons. Bicorn edged in white with red plume.

3º Almansa (1676) 
Collars, cuffs and lapels sky blue piped white, sky blue pocket piping, with white metal buttons. Bicorn edged in white with red plume.

4º Pavia (1684) 
Collars and cuffs yellow piped white, lapels scarlet piped white, scarlet pocket piping, with white metal buttons. Bicorn edged in white with red plume.

5º Villaviciosa (1689) 
Collars, cuffs and lapels green piped white, green pocket piping, with white metal buttons. Bicorn edged in white with red plume.

6º Sagunto (1703) 
Collars yellow piped white, cuffs and lapels green piped white, green pocket piping, with white metal buttons. Bicorn edged in white with red plume.

7º Numancia (1707) 
Collars, cuffs and lapels black piped white, black pocket piping, with white metal buttons. Bicorn edged in white with red plume.

8º Lusitania (1709) 
Collars yellow piped white, cuffs and lapels black piped white, black pocket piping, with white metal buttons. Bicorn edged in white with red plume.

M1811 Uniforms

1º Rey (1674)

2º Reina (1730)

3º Almansa (1676)

4º Pavia (1684)

5º Villaviciosa (1689)

6º Sagunto (1703)

7º Numancia (1707)

8º Lusitania (1709)

9º Granada (1811)

10º Madrid (1811)

Hussar Regiments

Changes of 1803 
In 1803 the 7º Numancia and 8º Lusitania dragoons were converted to hussars.

1º Húsares de Numancia (1803) 
Converted back to dragoons in 1805.

2º Húsares de Lusitania (1803) 
Converted back to dragoons in 1805.

3º Húsares de Olivenza (1803) 
Converted back to Cazadores a Caballo in 1805.

4º Húsares de España (1803) 
Converted back to Cazadores a Caballo in 1805.

5º Húsares de Maria Luisa (1793) 
Converted to 1º Húsares de Maria Luisa in 1805.

6º Húsares Españoles (1795) 
Converted to 2º Húsares Españoles in 1805.

Guard Cavalry Regiments

References 

Spanish military uniforms
Napoleonic Wars
19th-century clothing